Delano Potgieter (born 5 August 1996) is a South African first-class cricketer. He made his first-class debut for Gauteng against Northerns. In September 2018, he was named in Gauteng's squad for the 2018 Africa T20 Cup. He was the leading run-scorer for Gauteng in the tournament, with 217 runs in six matches. He was the leading wicket-taker for Gauteng in the 2018–19 CSA Provincial One-Day Challenge, with 17 dismissals in nine matches.

In September 2019, he was named in the squad for the Jozi Stars team for the 2019 Mzansi Super League tournament. Later the same month, he was named in Gauteng's squad for the 2019–20 CSA Provincial T20 Cup. In April 2021, Potgieter was named in the South Africa Emerging Men's squad for their six-match tour of Namibia. Later the same month, he was named in North West's squad, ahead of the 2021–22 cricket season in South Africa.

References

External links
 

1996 births
Living people
Cricketers from Port Elizabeth
South African cricketers
Gauteng cricketers
Lions cricketers
Jozi Stars cricketers
MI Cape Town cricketers
North West cricketers